White People is the second studio album by Handsome Boy Modeling School. It was released on Elektra Records on November 9, 2004. The album features guest appearances from a diverse array of performers, including Linkin Park, Del tha Funky Homosapien, The Mars Volta, De La Soul, Jack Johnson, Cat Power, Lord Finesse, Pharrell Williams, John Oates, RZA, Julee Cruise, El-P, Mike Patton, and comedians Tim Meadows and Father Guido Sarducci.

Reception
At Metacritic, which assigns a weighted average score out of 100 to reviews from mainstream critics, White People received an average score of 66% based on 28 reviews, indicating "generally favorable reviews".

John Murphy of MusicOMH called it "the most innovative, original and enjoyable hip-hop album since Outkast's Speakerboxxx/The Love Below."

Track listing

Charts

References

External links

2004 albums
Handsome Boy Modeling School albums
Elektra Records albums
Albums produced by Dan the Automator
Albums produced by Prince Paul (producer)